"Flexaa" is a song by Finnish rapper Cheek featuring Sanni and VilleGalle. The song peaked at number three on the Finnish Singles Chart.

Charts

References

2014 songs
2014 singles
Cheek (rapper) songs
Finnish-language songs